Cyril Jonard (born 23 February 1976) is a French judoka. He competes in judo events for the visually impaired and blind. Jonard has Usher syndrome; he is both deaf and visually impaired. He competes against non-deaf judoka.

Jonard took part in the 2004 Summer Paralympics in Athens. He won gold in the men's half-middleweight category (-81 kg) when he defeated Japan's Yuji Kato by ippon within just a few seconds in the final.

He was subsequently awarded a knighthood in the Légion d'honneur, the highest decoration in France, by French President Jacques Chirac. He also received a personal letter of congratulations from President Chirac for his achievement.

Jonard represented France again at the 2008 Summer Paralympics in Beijing, and won silver in the under 81 kg category, defeated in the final by Cuba's Isao Cruz.

References

External links 
 
 

1976 births
Living people
French male judoka
Paralympic judoka of France
Paralympic gold medalists for France
Paralympic silver medalists for France
Judoka at the 2004 Summer Paralympics
Judoka at the 2008 Summer Paralympics
Medalists at the 2004 Summer Paralympics
Medalists at the 2008 Summer Paralympics
Chevaliers of the Légion d'honneur
Paralympic medalists in judo
French deafblind people
20th-century French people
21st-century French people
French blind people